Kete Krachi District is a former district council that was located in Volta Region (now currently in Oti Region), Ghana. Originally created as an ordinary district assembly in 1975. However on 1988, it was split off into two new district assemblies: Krachi District (capital: Kete Krachi) and Nkwanta District (capital: Nkwanta). The district assembly was located in the northern part of Volta Region and had Kete Krachi as its capital town.

References

1989 disestablishments in Africa
Volta Region
Former districts of Ghana
States and territories disestablished in 1989